The Wheel Store is a historic commercial building at River and Broad Streets in Batesville, Arkansas.  It is a two-story ashlar sandstone structure, with a flat roof.  Its front facade has a single storefront, with two now-filled window openings flanking the entrance on the first level, and two windows above.  The building was erected in 1887 to house a store and meeting space for a local chapter of the Agricultural Wheel, an agrarian reform organization established in Arkansas in the early 1880s.

The building was listed on the National Register of Historic Places in 1988.

See also
National Register of Historic Places listings in Independence County, Arkansas

References

Commercial buildings on the National Register of Historic Places in Arkansas
Buildings and structures completed in 1887
Buildings and structures in Batesville, Arkansas
National Register of Historic Places in Independence County, Arkansas
Clubhouses on the National Register of Historic Places in Arkansas
1887 establishments in Arkansas
Sandstone buildings in the United States